The women's 4 x 400 metres relay event at the 2009 European Athletics U23 Championships was held in Kaunas, Lithuania, at S. Dariaus ir S. Girėno stadionas (Darius and Girėnas Stadium) on 18 and 19 July.

Medalists

*: Competed in heat.

Results

Final
19 July

Heats
18 July
Qualified: first 3 in each heat 2 best to the Final

Heat 1

Heat 2

Participation
According to an unofficial count, 45 athletes from 10 countries participated in the event.

 (5)
 (4)
 (4)
 (5)
 (4)
 (4)
 (5)
 (4)
 (5)
 (5)

References

4 x 400 metres relay
Relays at the European Athletics U23 Championships